This article is about the particular significance of the decade 1820–1829 to Wales and its people.

Incumbents
Prince of Wales – George (until 29 January 1820) (became George IV)
Princess of Wales – Caroline of Brunswick (until 29 January 1820)

Arts and literature

New books
John Elias – Golygiad Ysgrythurol ar Gyfiawnhad Pechadur (1821)
Felicia Hemans – The Forest Sanctuary (1825)
Thomas Price (Carnhuanawc) – An Essay on the Physiognomy and Physiology of the Present Inhabitants of Britain (1829)
David Richards (Dafydd Ionawr) – Cywydd y Dilyw (1821)

Music
John Ellis – Eliot (hymn tune) (1823)
Edward Jones – Hen Ganiadau Cymru (1820)
 Peroriaeth Hyfryd (collection of hymns including Caersalem by Robert Edwards) (1827)
Seren Gomer (collection of hymns including Grongar by John Edwards) (1824)

Births
1820
21 May – Sir Thomas Lloyd, 1st Baronet, politician and landowner (d. 1877)
1821
24 June – Guillermo Rawson, Argentinian politician (d. 1890)
16 July – John Jones (Mathetes), preacher and writer (d. 1878)
1822
2 March – Michael D. Jones, Patagonian settler (d. 1898)
1823
8 January – Alfred Russel Wallace, biologist (d. 1913)
March – Rowland Williams (Hwfa Môn), poet and archdruid (d. 1905)
23 November – Sir John Evans, archaeologist (d. 1908)
1824
date unknown – John Basson Humffray, political reformer in Australia (d. 1891)
1825
7 June – R. D. Blackmore, novelist (d. 1900)
1826
13 January – Henry Matthews, 1st Viscount Llandaff (d. 1913)
1 March – John Thomas, harpist (d. 1913)
8 May – George Osborne Morgan, lawyer (d. 1897)
11 May – David Charles Davies, Nonconformist leader (d. 1891)
1827
27 October – Joseph Tudor Hughes (Blegwryd), harp prodigy (d. 1841)
1828
30 January – John David Jenkins, philanthropist (d. 1876)
1829
27 January – Isaac Roberts, astronomer (d. 1904)

Deaths
1820
29 January – King George III of the United Kingdom, Prince of Wales 1751–1760
16 June – Thomas Jones of Denbigh, Methodist preacher and writer (b. 1756)
27 June – William Lort Mansel, bishop and academic (b. 1753)
23 August – John Randles, harpist (b. 1763)
28 August – Henry Mills, musician (b. 1757)
1821
2 May – Hester Thrale, diarist (b. 1741)
7 August – Caroline of Brunswick, former Princess of Wales (1795–1820), 53
1822
30 March – David Thomas (Dafydd Ddu Eryri), poet (b. 1759)
date unknown – Stephen Kemble, actor, brother of Sarah Siddons (b. 1758)
1823
26 February – John Philip Kemble, actor, brother of Sarah Siddons (b. 1757)
1825
24 February – Thomas Bowdler, editor (b. 1754)
9 June – Abraham Rees, encyclopaedist (b. 1743)
10 August – Joseph Harris (Gomer), Baptist minister, poet and editor (b. 1773)
1827
date unknown – Helen Maria Williams, novelist and poet (b. c. 1761)
1828
September – William Madocks, landowner
1829
26 January – Benjamin Millingchamp, collector of manuscripts (b. 1756)
June – Elizabeth Randles, harpist (b. 1801)